The canton of Argentan-2 is an administrative division of the Orne department, northwestern France. It was created at the French canton reorganisation which came into effect in March 2015. Its seat is in Argentan.

It consists of the following communes:
 
Argentan (partly)
Bailleul
Coudehard
Coulonces
Écorches
Fontaine-les-Bassets
Ginai
Gouffern en Auge
Guêprei
Louvières-en-Auge
Merri
Mont-Ormel
Montreuil-la-Cambe
Neauphe-sur-Dive
Ommoy
Le Pin-au-Haras
Saint-Gervais-des-Sablons
Saint-Lambert-sur-Dive
Tournai-sur-Dive
Trun
Villedieu-lès-Bailleul

References

Cantons of Orne